Online platform may refer to:

 Online platforms for collaborative consumption
 Online discussion platform
 Online marketing platform
 Online video platform
 Electronic trading platform, for financial products